The USA Field Hockey Hall of Fame honors the achievements of athletes and/or coaches of USA field hockey teams. The permanent home of USA Field Hockey's hall of fame is located at Ursinus College, Collegeville, Pennsylvania.

Hall of Fame Inductees
The members of the Hall of Fame, and the year of induction, are:

1988

Ruth Heller Aucott
Adele Boyd
Robin Cash
Gertrude Dunn
Frances Elliott
Vonnie Gros
Mary Ann Leight Harris
Phyllis Stadler Lyon
Betty C. Miller
Joan Moser
Patricia Kenworthy Nuckols
Elenore Pepper
Chickie Geraci Poisson
F. Elizabeth Richey
Alison Hersey Risch
Nancy Sawin
Betty Shellenberger
Barbara Strebeigh
Joan Edenborn Stiles
Bonnie Smith Taylor
Anne B. Townsend
Anne McConaghie Volp
Alice Putnam Willetts

1989

Gwen Cheeseman Alexander
Beth Anders
Gwen Cheeseman
Anita Corl Huntsman
Jill Grant Lindenfeld
Chris Larson Mason
Charlene Morett
Karen C. Shelton
Julie Staver

1994

Beth Beglin
Sheryl Johnson
Marcy Place

2004

Leslie Lyness
Laurel Hershey Martin
Barbara Marois
Christy Morgan
Marcia Pankratz
Patricia Shea
Pam Neiss Stuper

2014

1984 U.S. Women's Olympic Bronze Medal Team
Katie Kauffman Beach
Pam Bustin
Tracey Fuchs
Kate "Tiki" Kinnear
Jill Reeve
Nigel Traverso

2016

1975 West Chester State College National Championship Team
Kris Fillat (Buchanan)
Manzar Iqbal
Kelli James
Carrie Lingo
Antoinette Lucas
Dina Rizzo

2018

Steve Danielson
Keli Smith Puzo
Amy Tran Swenson

Hall of Fame Honorary Members 
The members of the Hall of Fame Honorary Members, and the year of induction, are:

1922

Helen G. Armfield
Hilda Burr (England)
H. Crawhall-Wilson
Gertrude East
Nan Hunt
G.M. Inglis
Sophie Pearson
Cecily Warner

1926

Constance M. K. Applebee
Helen Ferguson
Mrs. Edward B. Krumbhaar

1929

Cynthia Wesson

1933

Anne B. Townsend

1937

W. A. Baumann
Hilda Light
Edith Thompson

1939

Gertrude Hooper

1946

Anne G. Toomey

1949

May P. Fogg

1950

Sylvia Hoffa

1952

Helen Bina
Barbara Strebeigh

1953

Anne Lee Delano

1955

Frances Pierce

1956

Elizabeth Burger Jackson

1957

Anna Espenschade
Alfreda Mosscrop
Marion Pettit
Bessis Rudd

1959

Betty Richey
Harriet Wilson

1960

Marjorie Strang

1962

Betty Shellenberger

1963

Joyce Gran Barry
Ethlyn A. Davis
Frances Homer
Harriet H. Rogers

1964

Sophie Dickson

1967

Frances Blomfield

1968

Ethel Kloberg
Nancy Sawin

1971

Grace Robertson
Bess Taylor

1972

Carol Haussermann
Elizabeth Williams

1973

Audrey Erickson

1973

Audrey Erickson

1974

Jen Shillingford
Jackie Westervelt

1978

Phyllis Weikert

1982

Anne LeDuc
Bea Toner

1985

Sally Wilkins

1986

Ellen Hawver

1991

Bev Johnson

2004

Pat Hayes
Ruth Lajoie
Leslie Milne

2014

Tom Harris
Pam Hixon
Steve Jennings
Linda Kreiser
Sharon Taylor

2016

Karen Collins
Roque Viegas
Allan Woods

See also

 List of sports awards honoring women
NCAA Women's Field Hockey Championship

References

External links
USA Field Hockey Hall of Fame

Sports awards honoring women
Field hockey in the United States
Halls of fame in Pennsylvania
Museums in Montgomery County, Pennsylvania
Sports halls of fame
Sports museums in Pennsylvania
Ursinus College